Barbara Hayden, usually known professionally as Pat Silver or Pat Silver-Lasky, is an American actress, screenwriter, and writer, mostly known for her collaborations with her second husband, Jesse Lasky Jr.

Beginnings
Born in Seattle, Washington, Silver-Lasky attended the University of Washington as a drama major, as well as Stanford University and Reed College. Silver-Lasky worked in films and TV under her birth name, Barbara Hayden. When she played the lead in an episode of Rescue 8 and went on to write three more episodes, she took the pen name Pat Silver.

Collaborations with Jesse L. Lasky Jr.
Silver-Lasky wrote four books with her second husband, Jesse, including the best-selling historical novel The Offer, eight films, nearly 100 TV scripts, including the award-winning "Explorers" series ("Ten Who Dared" in the United States). Their verse play Ghost Town won several awards in the U.S. In 1984 and 1986, their TV series Philip Marlowe, Private Eye won three awards in the USA and in the Netherlands.

In 1987, Pat and Jesse wrote the play Vivien based on their book Love Scene, the story of Laurence Olivier and Vivien Leigh. Pat directed its highly acclaimed first production at the Melrose Theatre in Los Angeles (1987) and directed the London rehearsed reading of Viven in 1992.

Solo work
Silver-Lasky produced, wrote, directed, and acted in the first live TV drama series from Hollywood, Mabel's Fables, for KTLA (Paramount Pictures), which received an Emmy nomination. She also appeared in feature roles in films, played leading and co-starring roles on television, and directed for the theater in Los Angeles and Palm Springs.

As an ASCAP writer, she wrote lyrics for 14 published and recorded songs, including "While You're Young" for Johnny Mathis's album Portrait of Johnny. She wrote the lyrics for two films at Columbia Studios.

Silver-Lasky served as a story editor on the second Marlowe series (see credits). Silver-Lasky has written articles and interviews, contributed to various British antique journals and written short stories for international magazines, including a 1999 series of romantic short stories for A World of Romance.

Silver-Lasky has lectured on script writing at several American universities, and was script consultant and guest lecturer at the London International Film School for eight years until 1999.

Personal life
In 1946, Silver-Lasky married the composer, singer, and guitarist Tony Romano, with whom she has a son, producer, arranger, and guitarist Richard Niles, and a daughter, Lisa Hayden Miller, a singer, restaurateur, chef and cookbook writer, author of Galley Guru. In 1959, she married Hollywood screenwriter and author Jesse L. Lasky Jr., son of the film pioneer Jesse Lasky. Jesse Lasky Jr. died in 1988. In 1995, Silver-Lasky met British cartoonist Peter Betts, known as Peeby, and they married in 1997. They lived in London but moved to Orange County, California, in 2009.

Credits

As an actress

"The Crimson Kimono" (1959) — Mother
"Have Gun – Will Travel" episode "The Man Who Lost" (1959) — Mrs. Bryson
"Rescue 8" episode "Find That Bomb!" (1958) — Kit Shocky
"A Perilous Journey" (1953) — Cathy
"The Loves of Carmen" (1948) (uncredited) — Woman on Stagecoach

Books

Ride the Tiger
A Star Called Wormwood
The Offer
Screenwriting for the 21st Century
Men of Mystery
Dark Dimensions
Love Scene
The Offer

Theater productions
Ghost Town
Gehenna of the Bone (London)
Vivien

Feature films
The Wizard of Baghdad (1960)
7 Women from Hell (1961)
Pirates of Tortuga (1961)
Land Raiders (1970)
Ace Up My Sleeve (1976)
The Bulldance (1989)

Television series
Mabel's Fables
Shannon
Paladin
The New Breed
The Saint
The Baron
Danger Man
The Avengers
The Protectors
BBC Musical Specials
Space: 1999
The Swinging Scene
Ben Hall
The World of Lowell Thomas
The Explorers
Philip Marlowe, Private Eye
Love at First Sight

References

External links
Official website

Peter Betts website

American women screenwriters
Year of birth missing (living people)
Living people
Reed College alumni
Writers from Seattle
Screenwriting instructors
Screenwriters from Washington (state)
21st-century American women